Tamasa is a genus of cicadas in the family Cicadidae. There are at least four described species in Tamasa.

Species
These four species belong to the genus Tamasa:
 Tamasa burgessi (Distant, 1905) c g
 Tamasa doddi (Goding & Froggatt, 1904) c g
 Tamasa rainbowi Ashton, 1912 c g
 Tamasa tristigma (Germar, 1834) c g
Data sources: i = ITIS, c = Catalogue of Life, g = GBIF, b = Bugguide.net

References

Further reading

External links

 

Tamasini
Cicadidae genera